SUN-AIR of Scandinavia A/S, usually shortened to SUN-AIR, is a Danish regional airline headquartered in Billund, with its main base at Billund Airport. It operates scheduled services as a franchise of British Airways using their name and corporate design as British Airways - operated by SUN-AIR of Scandinavia A/S. The airline also offers charter flights, air taxi services, specialist aerial work and aircraft brokerage services.

History

Early years

The airline was established by Niels Sundberg and commenced operations in 1978. The company initially operated solely as an air taxi and charter service. During 1987, the decision was taken to develop the company into a regional airline. By 1996, the airline was conducting around 250 departures each week and carrying roughly 120,000 passengers annually; at the time, Sun-Air's fleet comprises ten 18-seat British Aerospace Jetstream 31s and two 30-seat British Aerospace Jetstream 41s.

In 1993, Sun-Air opened its workshop at Aarhus Airport. During 1993, Sun-Air acquired 10% of Thisted-based North-West Air Service; over the following years, it would purchase the company outright. Sun-Air's maintenance division largely focuses on performing extensive aircraft overhauls, commonly replacing elements such as the landing gear, composite materials, wheels and brakes. Following the acquisition of aircraft maintenance company ScanTech (Scandinavian Aircraft Technologies A/S) in November 2014, maintenance of the company's Hawker Beechcraft aircraft was moved to the latter's facilities at Sindal Airport shortly thereafter. On 1 May 2016, Sun-Air Technic was formed by the merger of ScanTech and Sun–Air's workshops and warehouses. In 2015, Sun-Air acquired shares in Avex Technical, leading to the company cooperating with Avex Air in the South African market to perform aircraft maintenance and overhaul services.

On 1 August 1996, Sun-Air became a franchisee of the large United Kingdom-based airline British Airways, being the first regional airline outside of the UK to commit to a franchise agreement with the airline. Starting that month, Sun-Air services would form a network linking with British Airways' own services at Copenhagen, Oslo and Stockholm.

Under the British Airways franchisee arrangement, all scheduled services were operated under the British Airways Express brand; this name had already been applied to other airline's services via separate arrangements, including Brymon Airways, CityFlyer Express, Loganair and Manx Airlines. In accordance with this branding, Sun-Air's scheduled flights are operated with British Airways logos being prominently displayed in their corporate design. During the late 1990s, Danish artist Per Arnoldi designed the tail art for the new livery applied to Sun-Air's fleet; the livery has since been redesigned to incorporate the Union Jack flag on the tailfin instead.

Developments since the 2000s
Part of the reason Sun-Air had agreed to become a franchisee was to gain a strategic partner, particularly one that would be able and willing to assist in its growth and the acquisition of larger aircraft. During the late 1990s, Sun-Air initiated a long-term plan to introduce jet-powered airliners into its fleet by 2000. As a step towards this, and to help it handle increasing passenger traffic on its routes between Denmark and Britain, it acquired a pair of second-hand British Aerospace ATPs in late 1997. During 2001, in response to a complaint by Sun-Air, rival airlines Scandinavian Airlines and Maersk Air were fined around €52 million ($44 million) for engaging in anti-competitive behaviour following an investigation by the European Union.

During 2009, it was decided to restructure Sun-Air's charter division, leading to it being rebranded as JoinJet; Niels Sundberg's son, Kristoffer Sundberg, was appointed to head this subsidiary. Focusing largely on business jet operations, JoinJet taken steps to build an individual identity, including the adoption of a unique livery and distinct logo. It maintains a separate employee roster, which includes pilots, flight attendants, flight coordinators, and its own sales team.

According to Sun-Air, the company has traditionally placed an emphasis on providing passengers with a comprehensive service; as such, all scheduled flights have included provisions for meals, drinks, and luggage as default since 2009. The airline has been awarded multiple prizes related to its service quality, including the award of Best European Airline at the Danish Travel Awards.

In April 2014, Sun-Air launched a new daily services between Billund and Zurich in Switzerland, served by its Dornier 328Jets. During the 2010s, Sun-Air became the biggest civil operator of the 328JET. On 25 February 2017, British Airways terminated its flights from Bremen to London and Manchester which were both operated by Sun-Air; the latter had maintained a base for these routes at Bremen Airport.

During 2017, Kristoffer Sundberg took over as CEO of Sun-Air while Niels Sundberg remained chairman of the board. The airline is wholly owned by Niels Sundberg and has 175 employees. Sun Air is an affiliate member of the Oneworld alliance and also uses British Airways' frequent flyer program Executive Club.

In the wake of the COVID-19 pandemic, Sun-Air terminated several routes, including all services to Toulouse. In January 2021, the company filed for insolvency for its German operational subsidiary Sun-Air of Germany and laid off most of its Germany based staff.

Destinations
As of September 2022, after suspending several routes in the wake of the COVID-19 pandemic, SUN-AIR of Scandinavia serves or has previously served the following destinations as a British Airways franchisee:

Fleet

Current fleet

As of September 2022, the SUN-AIR of Scandinavia fleet consists of the following aircraft:

Historical fleet 
SUN-Air of Scandinavia has previously operated the following aircraft types:

References

External links

 

Airlines of Denmark
Airlines established in 1978
Oneworld affiliate members
Companies based in Billund Municipality
1978 establishments in Denmark
British Airways